Women of the Otherworld is the name of a fantasy series by Canadian author Kelley Armstrong.

The books feature werewolves, witches, necromancers, sorcerers, and vampires struggling to fit as "normal" in today's world.  The series also includes novellas and short stories, published online (and one in an anthology).

Novels
Note: all publishing information is for U.S. release dates. However, the books have been published in the United Kingdom and in Canada.
Book 01: Bitten (published October, 2001 by Viking Press)
Book 02: Stolen (published May, 2003 by Viking Press)
Book 03: Dime Store Magic (published 2004 by Bantam Spectra)
Book 04: Industrial Magic (published 2004 by Bantam Spectra)
Book 05: Haunted (published 2005 by Bantam Spectra)
Book 06: Broken (published May 2006 by Bantam Spectra)
Book 07: No Humans Involved (published May 2007 by Bantam Spectra)
Book 08: Personal Demon (published April 2008 by Bantam Spectra)
Book 09: Living with the Dead (published November 2008 by Bantam Spectra)
Book 10: Frostbitten (published September 2009 by Bantam Spectra)
Book 11: Waking the Witch (published July 2010 by Bantam Spectra)
Book 12: Spell Bound (published July 2011 by Dutton Penguin)
Book 13: Thirteen (published July 2012 by Orbit)

Narrators
The narrators change from book to book, although they do reappear in other books.
Bitten: Elena Michaels, a werewolf. She has to deal with a terrible childhood as well as accepting all of who she is.
Stolen: Elena Michaels faces a group of humans who kidnap her and other supernaturals.
Dime Store Magic: Paige Winterbourne, a witch. Leader of the American Coven.
Industrial Magic: Paige Winterbourne must deal with Lucas' family and a villain who is murdering children.
Haunted: Eve Levine, the ghost of a half-demon witch. She has to contend with fears for her daughter's safety, who survived her and is being raised by another witch. She cannot directly protect her daughter since she is dead.
Broken: Elena Michaels
Chaotic (in anthology Dates from Hell): Hope Adams, a chaos half-demon. Journalist with newspaper True News.
No Humans Involved: Jaime Vegas, a necromancer. She works in Hollywood as a necromancer on television, but saves her real powers for other work.
Personal Demon : Hope Adams & sorcerer Lucas Cortez.
Living With the Dead : Hope Adams, clairvoyant Adele Morrissey, human Robyn Peltier & necromancer John Findlay (Finn).
Men of the Otherworld : Malcolm Danvers, Clayton Danvers & Jeremy Danvers.
Frostbitten: Elena Michaels
Tales of the Otherworld : Eve Levine, Clayton Danvers, Elena Michaels, Lucas Cortez & Paige Winterbourne.
Waking the Witch: Savannah Levine
Spell Bound: Savannah Levine
Thirteen: Savannah Levine (Eve, Paige, Hope, Jaime and Elena each narrate one chapter)

Complete list of books and novellas, in order

Below is a complete, in-universe chronological list of the series' 70 novels, online work, short stories, novellas and contributions to anthologies, based on the timeline given on Kelley Armstrong's official website.

Armstrong's "Short Fiction" page on her site also lists the following five stories, but they are not listed on the timeline:

See also
 List of Women of the Otherworld characters
Darkest Powers - Another series by Kelley Armstrong, set in the same universe as the Otherworld
 The Summoning
 The Awakening
 The Reckoning
 The Gathering

References

External links
Author's website

Novels by Kelley Armstrong
Romance novel series
Contemporary fantasy novel series
Urban fantasy novels